Ruby Hoffman (July 28, 1886 – September 22, 1973) was an American silent film and stage actress.

Background
Ruby Hoffman was born on July 28, 1886, in Philadelphia, Pennsylvania, United States. She was an actress, known for The Lightning Raider (1919), The Dictator (1915) and The House of Hate (1918).

Personal life
Hoffman married Gitz Rice in 1918, Rice later died in 1947. She died on September 22, 1973, in Oxford, Ohio at the age of 87.

Filmography

 The Taint (1914)
 The Million (1914)
 Mistress Nell (1915)
 Children of the Ghetto (1915)
 The Dictator (1915)
 Poor Schmaltz (1915)
 The Fixer (1915)
 The Politicians (1915)
 Keep Moving (1915)
 The Danger Signal (1915)
 The Law of Blood (1916)
 Wild Oats (1916)
 The Perils of Divorce (1916)
 A Woman's Honor (1916)
 Her American Prince (1916)
 The Summer Girl (1916)
 The Slave Market (1917)
 Seven Deadly Sins - Passion (1917)
 The Dummy (1917)
 The Fatal Ring (1917)
 The House of Hate (1918)
 Uncle Tom's Cabin (1918)
 Upside Down (1919)
 The Lightning Raider (1919)
 Trailed by Three (1920)
 Cynthia of the Minute (1920)
 The Tiger's Cub (1920)

Notes

References

External links

 https://www.fandango.com/people/ruby-hoffman-298758/biography

1886 births
1973 deaths
American film actresses
American silent film actresses
20th-century American actresses